Shimane usually refers to Shimane Prefecture, a prefecture of Japan located in the Chūgoku of Honshu. Shimane may also refer to:

Shimane at-large district, a constituency that represents Shimane Prefecture in the House of Councillors in the Diet of Japan
Shimane, Shimane, a town located in Yatsuka District, Shimane Prefecture, Japan
Shimane University, a national university in Japan

See also
Shiman, a village in Susan-e Gharbi Rural District, Susan District, Izeh County, Khuzestan Province, Iran